Economics of Education Review is a quarterly peer-reviewed academic journal covering education economics. It was established in 1981 and is published by Elsevier. The editor-in-chief is Celeste Carruthers (University of Tennessee, Knoxville). According to the Journal Citation Reports, the journal has a 2020 impact factor of 2.238.

References

External links

Education economics
Education journals
Economics journals
Quarterly journals
Publications established in 1981
Elsevier academic journals
English-language journals